Michael James is the pseudonym of a British writer, educator and illustrator. He fictionalised his experiences as a teacher in That'll Teach You!. The novel describes a fictionalised incident of alleged misconduct and its consequences. Researching Sex and Lies in the Classroom: Allegations of Sexual Misconduct in Schools characterises the novel as "a revenge text", because of the way in which some characters are depicted.

Books

References

Living people
20th-century English novelists
English male novelists
Year of birth missing (living people)